Tau'uta Reds is a former Tongan rugby union team that played in the Pacific Rugby Cup from 2006 to 2010. The other Tongan team in the Cup was Tautahi Gold.

The team's name is from the Tau’uta who were the Tongan land warriors that fought in the war which united Tonga as one kingdom. Red represents the colour of blood and the sacrifice which the saviour made on the cross for all mankind.

The Tau'uta Reds were minor premiers in 2007 and hosted the Pacific Rugby Cup final at Teufaiva Stadium in Nukualofa on 5 May 2007, but lost the match 15–35 to Upolu Samoa.

Record

Honours
Pacific Rugby Cup
 Runner-up: 2007.

Season standings
Pacific Rugby Cup
{| class="wikitable" style="text-align:center;"
|- border=1 cellpadding=5 cellspacing=0
! style="width:20px;"|Year
! style="width:20px;"|Pos
! style="width:20px;"|Pld
! style="width:20px;"|W
! style="width:20px;"|D
! style="width:20px;"|L
! style="width:20px;"|F
! style="width:20px;"|A
! style="width:25px;"|+/-
! style="width:20px;"|BP
! style="width:20px;"|Pts
! style="width:50px;"|Final
! align=left|Notes 
|- 
|align=left|2010
|6th
|5||1||0||4||82||169||−87||1||5	
| — ||align=left| Did not compete in finals
|- 
|align=left|2009
|5th
|5||1||0||4||62||113||−51||2||6
| — ||align=left| Did not compete in finals
|-
|align=left|2008
|5th
|5||2||0||3||84||95||−11||1||9
| — ||align=left| Did not compete in finals
|-
|align=left|2007
|1st
|5||4||0||1||108||102||+6||1||17
| 15–35 ||align=left| Lost final to Upolu Samoa
|-
|align=left|2006
|4th
|5||2||0||3||70||89||−19||2||10
| — ||align=left| Did not compete in finals

|}

Internationally capped players

References

Rugby union in Tonga